Sonchella is a genus of Asian flowering plants in the family Asteraceae.

 Species
 Sonchella dentata (Ledeb.) Sennikov - Russia (Altai, Tuva), China (Qinghai), Mongolia
 Sonchella stenoma (Turcz. ex DC.) Sennikov - Russia (Buryatiya , Chita), China (Tibet, Gansu, Inner Mongolia), Mongolia

References

Asteraceae genera
Cichorieae